The Ahmedabad–Udaipur Line is a railway route of both Western and North Western Railway zone of Indian Railways. It plays an important role in short-connectivity reaching to North India and Eastern India from Gujarat and Coastal areas of Maharashtra, Goa, Karnataka & Kerala.

This corridor passes through the ranges of Arvalli of Northern Gujarat and Udaipur division of Rajasthan, In this area, there is also a mine of Zinc and Phosphate in Zawar and Umra which it makes direct and important mineral transportation to rest of India with a stretch of 

This mainline route is divided into two sections: 
1) The first section is of Ahmedabad–Himmatnagar Junction with the length of  comes under the jurisdiction of Western Railways.
2) The second section is Himmatnagar Junction–Udaipur City with a length of  comes under the jurisdiction of North Western Railways.

Also contains two branch lines of this corridor which both are comes in Western Railways these are:
1) The first branch line is Himmatnagar Junction–Khed Bramha with a length of  

History

This line came to be known as  Metre Gauge Mainline with the other  Metre Gauge line via  , being called as the Chord Line. But in 1997 the other  Metre Gauge line via  , became  Broad Gauge line & was made as Delhi-Jaipur-Ahmedabad Mainline

Projects
Currently, there is a gauge conversion of the whole mainline with branches by the joint operation of Western Railways and North Western Railways is going on from 1 January 2017.

In this Joint project, the first section of the mainline from the Western Railways zone side gets totally converted into the broad gauge and DEMU trains are also started running on that route from 15 October 2019. The Broad Gauge conversion has been completed and On 31st OCTOBER, 2022,  Prime minister Shri Narendra Modi flagged off asarwa - udaipur express vide train number is 19703-19704 daily service.
On 3rd MARCH, 2023, JAIPUR - ASARWA SUPERFAST ( train no. 12981-82), KOTA ASARWA EXPRESS ( train number 19822-21 ) & INDORE - ASARWA  EXPRESS ( train number 19329-30 ) started.

See also
 Ahmedabad–Udaipur Express

References

Rail transport in Rajasthan
Transport in Udaipur
Railway lines in Gujarat
Transport in Ahmedabad
5 ft 6 in gauge railways in India